Indigofera tinctoria, also called true indigo, is a species of plant from the bean family that was one of the original sources of indigo dye.

Description 
It may be an annual, biennial, or perennial, depending on the climate in which it is grown. It has light green pinnate leaves and sheafs of pink or violet flowers.

The rotenoids deguelin, dehydrodeguelin, rotenol, rotenone, tephrosin and sumatrol can be found in I. tinctoria.

Distribution and habitat 
It has been naturalized to tropical and temperate Asia, as well as parts of Africa, but its native habitat is unknown since it has been in cultivation worldwide for many centuries.

Agricultural use 
The plant is a legume, so it is rotated into fields to improve the soil in the same way that other legume crops such as alfalfa and beans are. The plant is also widely grown as a soil-improving groundcover.

Dye 

Dye is obtained from the processing of the plant's leaves. They are soaked in water and fermented in order to convert the glycoside indican naturally present in the plant to the blue dye indigotin. The precipitate from the fermented leaf solution is mixed with a strong base such as lye.

Today most dye is synthetic, but natural dye from I. tinctoria is still available, marketed as natural colouring where it is known as tarum in Indonesia and nila in Malaysia. In Iran and areas of the former Soviet Union it is known as basma.

History 
Marco Polo (13th century) was the first European to report on the preparation of indigo in India. Indigo was quite often used in European easel painting, beginning in the Middle Ages.

See also
 Persicaria tinctoria

References

Further reading
 Feeser, Andrea. Red, White, and Black Make Blue: Indigo in the Fabric of Colonial South Carolina Life (University of Georgia Press; 2013) 140 pages; scholarly study explains how the plant's popularity as a dye bound together local and transatlantic communities, slave and free, in the 18th century.
 Grohmann, Adolf. Färberei and Indigofabrikation in Grohmann, A. 1933. Südarabien als Wirtschaftsgebiet, Schriften der Philosophischen Fakultät der Deutschen Universität in Prag 13th vol. (Rohrer; Leipzig) 45-8.

External links

tinctoria
Plant dyes
Flora of temperate Asia
Plants described in 1753
Taxa named by Carl Linnaeus
Groundcovers